Mim Khan (also Romanized as Mīm Khān) is a village in Jahanabad Rural District, in the Central District of Hirmand County, Sistan and Baluchestan Province, Iran. At the 2006 census, its population was 321, in 56 families.

References 

Populated places in Hirmand County